The 2013 African U-17 Championship was a football competition organized by the Confederation of African Football (CAF). The tournament took place in Morocco from 13 to 27 April. The top four teams qualified for the 2013 FIFA U-17 World Cup.

Qualification 

The qualifiers began on 7 September 2012 with the preliminary matches taking place, while the final round matches were played on 2 December 2012. At the end of the qualification, seven teams joined the hosts, Morocco.

Qualified teams 

 
 
 
 
 
  (Hosts)

Venues

Draw 
The draw for the tournament was held on 9 December 2012 in Cairo, Egypt.

Match officials 

Referees

 	Redouane Jiyed
 	Med Said Kordi
  	Davies Ogenche Omweno
 	Wiish Hagi Yabarow
 	Samuel Chirindza
 	Mahamadou Keita
 	Ali Mohamed Adelaid
 	Joshua Bondo
 	Achille Madila
 	Rainhold Shikongo
 	Maguette Ndiaye
 	Juste Ephrem Zio

Assistant referees
 	Bouazza Rouani
 	Eldrick Adelaide
 	Sidiki Sidibe
 	Mark Ssonko
 	Jerson Emiliano Dos Santos
 	Mothibidi Stevens Khumalo
 	Marius Donatien Tan
 	Abderahmane Warr
 	Babadjide Bienvenu Dina
 	Yahaya Mahamadou
 	Arsénio Chadreque Marengula
 	Kindie Mussie
 	Elvis Guy Noupue Nguegoue
 	Seydou Tiama

Squads

MRI controversy 

All players in the competition went through a mandatory MRI test which investigates bony fusion of the left distal radius (wrist). Several players were considered to be over-age by CAF and they were not eligible for the competition. The tests took place on 12 April, one day before the competition began leaving no time for a replacement players to be found. Ivory Coast, Congo and Nigeria each had three players found to be ineligible.

CAF released the names of the players who were found to be over-age:

Côte d'Ivoire
  Willy Britto Dagou (DF)
  Abdoul Diarrassouba (DF)
  Sidiki Dembele (MF)

Nigeria
  Wilfred Onyinye Ndidi (DF)
  Ibrahim Abdullahi (DF)
  Emmanuel Asadu (FW)

Congo
  Charlevy Mabiala (MF)
  Hardy Binguila (MF)
  Bermagin Kangou (FW)

Group stage 
Each group winner and runner-up advanced to the semi-finals.

Tiebreakers
 Greater number of points obtained in the matches between the concerned teams
 Best goal difference resulting from the matches between the concerned teams
 Greatest number of goals scored in the matches between the concerned teams
 Goal difference in all group matches
 Greatest number of goals scored in all group matches
 Fair Play point system in which the number of yellow and red cards are evaluated
 Drawing of lots by CAF Organising Committee

All times are (UTC±0)

Group A

Group B

Knock-out stage

Semi-finals

Third place match

Final

Winners

Goalscorers 
7 goals
  Success Isaac

5 goals
  Kelechi Iheanacho

4 goals

  Firas Belarbi
  Younes Bnou Marzouk
  Hazem Haj Hassen

3 goals

  Yahaya Umar
  Hamza Sakhi
  Mac Leod Eyamba

2 goals

  Kevine Bouanga Owane
  Yaw Yeboah
  Junior Landry

1 goal

  Orebonye Tumisang
  Bersyl Ngatsongo Obassi
  Kader Bidimbou
  Guy Bedi
  Prince Izu Omego
  Nabil Jaadi
  Ifeanyi Matthew
  Kabelano Mooketsane
  Walid Sabar
  Bernard Bulbwa
  Moez Abboud
  Mohamed El Boauzzati
  Chris Bile Bedia

Own goal

  Wilnod Allogho (against Tunisia)
  Yasser Sellimi (against Gabon)

References

External links 
 Official website

 
U-17
2013
2012–13 in Moroccan football
2013
2012–13 in Tunisian football
2012–13 in Ghanaian football
2013 in youth association football